Eumysia idahoensis is a species of snout moth in the genus Eumysia. It was described by Mackie in 1958. It is found in California, United States.

References

Moths described in 1958
Phycitinae